Senator Mack may refer to:

Andrew Mack (1780–1854), Michigan State Senate
Connie Mack III (born 1940), U.S. Senator from Florida
Ebenezer Mack (1791–1849), New York State Senate
Joseph Mack (politician) (1919–2005), Michigan State Senate
Mike Mack (1873–1949), Wisconsin State Senate